The team eventing in equestrian at the 1948 Olympic Games in London was held in the town of Aldershot and at the Tweseldown Racecourse from 10 to 13 August. The American team of Charles Anderson, Frank Henry and Earl Foster Thomson won the gold medal. Sweden won the silver medal and Mexico took bronze.

Competition format
The team and individual eventing competitions used the same scores.  Eventing consisted of a dressage test, a cross-country test, and a jumping test. Team eventing final scores were the sum of the three individual scores for riders from the same NOC.

Results

Standings after dressage

Standings after cross-country

Final standings after jumping

References

Sources
Organising Committee for the XIV Olympiad, The (1948). The Official Report of the Organising Committee for the XIV Olympiad, p. 342. LA84 Foundation. Retrieved 4 September 2016.

Equestrian at the Summer Olympics